The BQ Aquaris E4.5 is an Android smartphone from the Spanish manufacturer BQ that was released to market in June 2014 as a budget dual-SIM phone. The device shipped with Android versions starting from v4.0 and can be updated to Android 4.4.2 (KitKat). BQ elected not to skin the operating system and as such it retains the unmodified "Google Experience".

Ubuntu Edition 
The Aquaris E4.5 is notable for being the first commercially available phone to carry the Ubuntu Touch mobile operating system.

BQ would later follow a similar pattern with the Aquaris E5, releasing it first with Android and then with Ubuntu Touch.

See also 
 BQ Aquaris E5
 Comparison of smartphones

References

External links 
 

Android (operating system) devices
Ubuntu Touch devices
Aquaris E4.5
Mobile phones introduced in 2014
Discontinued smartphones